The HTC Desire 520 is a low-end Android smartphone released by HTC in 2015. The phone received mixed reviews. CNET described the phone as "[a] cheap Android device that sacrifices too much". Gadget Guy noted the phone's long battery life, but also described the phone as "one of the slowest phones [they have] ever reviewed" and its screen quality as sub-par.

References

Desire 520
Android (operating system) devices
Mobile phones introduced in 2015
Mobile phones with user-replaceable battery